Gregori Mikhailovich Chmara (Ukrainian: Григорій Михайлович Хмара, Russian: Григорий Михайлович Хмара; 29 July 1878 – 3 February 1970) was a Ukrainian-born stage and film actor whose career spanned six decades.

Biography 
Born in Poltava, Russian Empire (now Ukraine), Chmara began his career in 1910 at the Moscow Art Theater. He made several films in Russia and following the Russian Revolution he went to Germany where he performed as a singer. After meeting the Danish actress Asta Nielsen, the two fell in love and lived together, but never married.

In the 1930, he began appearing in Polish and French films, as well as German films. His last film role was in the Stellio Lorenzi-directed French television film adaptation of Fyodor Dostoevsky novel Crime and Punishment (Crime et châtiment), filmed in 1970 and released in 1971. Chmara died in France in 1970.

Selected filmography 
 
 Raskolnikow (1923) as Rodion Raskolnikow
 I.N.R.I. (1923) as Jesus Christ
 The House by the Sea (1924) as Enrico
 Hedda Gabler (1925) as Eilert Lövborg
 Joyless Street (1925) as Pjotr Orlow
 Athletes (1925) as Dr. Kürer
 Living Buddhas (1925) as Jebsun
 The Case of Prosecutor M (1928) as Poljarin
 Orient (1928)
 Rasputin (1928) as Grigori Rasputin
 The Man Who Murdered (1931) as Prince Cernuwicz
 The Black Hussar (1932) as Prince Potovski
 Man Without a Name (1932)
 Peter Voss, Thief of Millions (1932) as the pasha
 A Friend Will Come Tonight (1946) as the monocle-wearing German officer
 Mission in Tangier (1949) as the Russian singer
 Mannequins of Paris (1956) as Boris
 Elena and Her Men (1956) as Elena's servant
 A Bomb for a Dictator (1957) as the inquisitive passenger
 Mon pote le gitan (1959) as Grandpa
 Paris Does Not Exist (1969) as the old man

References

Bibliography 
 Jung, Uli & Schatzberg, Walter. Beyond Caligari: The Films of Robert Wiene. Berghahn Books, 1999.

External links 

1893 births
1970 deaths
Russian male film actors
Russian male silent film actors
Russian male stage actors
Ukrainian male stage actors
Ukrainian male film actors
Ukrainian male silent film actors
People who emigrated to escape Bolshevism
Emigrants from the Russian Empire to France
Actors  from Poltava